The women's cycling team pursuit at the 2012 Olympic Games in London was held at the London Velopark on 3 and 4 August.

The Great Britain team consisting of Dani King, Laura Trott and Joanna Rowsell won the gold medal in world record-breaking time. Including pre-Olympic races and the Olympic final itself, in the six times they had ridden together they had broken the world record in every race. Sarah Hammer, Dotsie Bausch and Jennie Reed of the United States took the silver medal and Canada's Tara Whitten, Gillian Carleton and Jasmin Glaesser won bronze.

Competition format

The women's team pursuit race consists of a 3 km race between two teams of three cyclists, starting on opposite sides of the track.  If one team catches the other, the race is over.

The tournament consisted of an initial qualifying round.  The top four teams in the qualifying round remained in contention for the gold medal, the 5th to 8th place teams could compete for a possible bronze, and the remaining teams were eliminated.

The "first round" consisted of the four fastest qualifiers competing in head-to-head races (1st vs. 4th, 2nd vs. 3rd).  The winners of these heats advanced to the gold medal final.  The other four qualifiers also competed in the first round (5th vs. 8th, 6th vs. 7th).  Advancement to the bronze medal final was based solely on time, with the fastest two teams among the six qualifiers who had not advanced to the gold medal final reaching the bronze medal final.  Qualification races were also held to determine 5th/6th place (between the next two fastest first-round teams who had not reached either the gold or bronze finals) and 7th/8th place (among the remaining two first-round teams).

Schedule 
All times are British Summer Time

Results

Qualification

First round

Finals

Final 7th-8th place

Final 5th-6th place

Final bronze medal

Final gold medal

Final classification
In the final classification are also the riders listed who competed during the Qualification and the First Round.

References

Track cycling at the 2012 Summer Olympics
Cycling at the Summer Olympics – Women's team pursuit
Olymp
Women's events at the 2012 Summer Olympics